Emirates Defence Industries Company (EDIC) was a defence industry holding company. In November 2019, the holding company was absorbed into EDGE Group.

History 
In 2014, the defence services and manufacturing entity was initiated in the form of a merger of 11 defence companies who are subsidiaries of Mubadala Development, Tawazun Holding and Emirates Advanced Invest Group. 

EDIC was jointly owned by the Mubadala Development Company, an investment fund of the Emirate of Abu Dhabi (60%) and Tawazun Holding.

References 

Manufacturing companies based in Abu Dhabi
Defence companies of the United Arab Emirates
2019 disestablishments in the United Arab Emirates
Emirati companies established in 2014
Manufacturing companies established in 2014
Holding companies established in 2014
Former defence companies